Ramiro Osvaldo Maldonado (born 20 July 1991) is an Argentine professional footballer who plays as a forward for Universitario de Sucre.

Career
Sportivo Las Parejas were Maldonado's first club. In his second season with the fourth tier team, 2014, they won promotion to Torneo Federal A for the 2015 campaign; with the forward having scored eight goals in thirty-four matches since the start of 2013–14; a further eight goals followed in Torneo Federal A. January 2016 saw Maldonado join Primera B Nacional side Gimnasia y Esgrima. He scored five goals in thirty-eight fixtures in all competitions across two campaigns. After a one season stint with Boca Unidos in 2017–18, which ended with relegation, Maldonado joined Primera B Nacional's Central Córdoba on 30 June 2018.

Career statistics
.

References

External links

1991 births
Living people
Argentine footballers
Argentine expatriate footballers
Footballers from Rosario, Santa Fe
Association football forwards
Torneo Argentino B players
Torneo Federal A players
Primera Nacional players
Bolivian Primera División players
Peruvian Segunda División players
Sportivo Las Parejas footballers
Gimnasia y Esgrima de Jujuy footballers
Boca Unidos footballers
Central Córdoba de Santiago del Estero footballers
Villa Mitre footballers
Deportivo Madryn players
Santos de Nasca players
Independiente Rivadavia footballers
UE Sant Julià players
Universitario de Sucre footballers
Argentine expatriate sportspeople in Peru
Argentine expatriate sportspeople in Andorra
Argentine expatriate sportspeople in Bolivia
Expatriate footballers in Peru
Expatriate footballers in Andorra
Expatriate footballers in Bolivia